Chicken Lickin is the second studio album by Funk, Inc., released in 1972.

Track listing

Personnel
Eugene Barr – Tenor saxophone
Cecil Hunt – Conga
Jimmy Munford – Drums, Vocals
Bobby Watley – Organ, Vocals
Steve Weakley – Guitar

External links
 Funk,Inc – Chicken Lickin' at Discogs

1972 albums
Funk, Inc. albums
Prestige Records albums
Albums recorded at Van Gelder Studio